Mejiro may refer to:

 Mejiro, Tokyo is a residential district of Toshima, Tokyo, Japan, centered at Mejiro Station of Yamanote Line.
 Another name for Warbling white-eye.
 Kurosaki Dojo - formerly known as Mejiro Gym, a Japanese kickboxing/MMA gym founded by Kenji Kurosaki.
 Mejiro Gym, a Dutch kickboxing gym founded by Jan Plas.
 Mejiro McQueen (Japanese : メジロマックイーン, April 3, 1987 - April 3, 2006) a Japanese Thoroughbred racehorse and sire.
 Mejiro Station (目白駅, Mejiro-eki) is a railway station on the Yamanote Line in Toshima, Tokyo, Japan, operated by the East Japan Railway Company (JR East). 
 Mejiro University (目白大学, Mejiro Daigaku) is a private university in Shinjuku, Tokyo, Japan.
 Mejiro-no-Mori (目白の森, Mejiro-no-Mori) is a public wooded area in Toshima Ward, Tokyo, Japan.
 Mejiroyamashita Station
 Juon Mejiro (目白 樹音, Mejiro Juon), a character from Japanese josei manga series Princess Jellyfish (Japanese: 海月姫, Hepburn: Kuragehime).